Robert Huber (born 30 May 1975) is a retired Swiss football defender.

References

1975 births
Living people
Swiss men's footballers
FC Zürich players
FC Winterthur players
Association football defenders
Swiss Super League players